31 Camelopardalis is a binary star system in the northern circumpolar constellation of Camelopardalis. It is visible to the naked eye as a dim point of light with a peak apparent visual magnitude of +5.12. Parallax measurements provide a distance estimate of approximately 460 light years away from the Sun, and the system is drifting closer to the Earth with a radial velocity of −3 km/s.

This is a single-lined spectroscopic binary in a circular orbit with an orbital period of 2.93 days. It is a detached binary with two main sequence components that do not fill their Roche lobes. The orbital plane is oriented near the line of sight from the Earth, making this a Beta Lyrae–type eclipsing binary variable star. It has the variable star designation TU Cameleopardis, while 31 Camelopardalis is the Flamsteed designation. The primary eclipse lowers the visual magnitude to 5.29, while the secondary eclipse lowers it to 5.22.

References

A-type main-sequence stars
Beta Lyrae variables
Spectroscopic binaries
Eclipsing binaries

Camelopardalis (constellation)
Durchmusterung objects
Camelopardalis, 31
039220
027971
2027
Camelopardalis, TU